Dimitrios Zarzavatsidis (born 15 January 1956) is a Greek former weightlifter. He competed in the men's heavyweight II event at the 1980 Summer Olympics. He is married to Voula Patoulidou.

References

External links
 

1956 births
Living people
Greek male weightlifters
Olympic weightlifters of Greece
Weightlifters at the 1980 Summer Olympics
Place of birth missing (living people)